Siegfried Müller may refer to:

 Siegfried Müller (SS officer) (1914–1974) - SS officer
 Siegfried Müller (mercenary) (1920–1983) - mercenary, Wehrmacht officer-candidate
 Siegfried Müller (sidecarcrosser), German sidecarcross racer